Nadège Lacroix (born 30 June 1986) is a Swiss actress, television personality. She became famous thanks to a French reality show, Secret Story. She starred in the Sous le soleil de Saint-Tropez and the scripted television drama series, Hollywood Girls : Une nouvelle vie en Californie.

Life and career

2009-10: Before Secret Story 
In 2009, she poses nude for the magazine Blick and becomes the first Swiss French to be included. Nadège participates, in 2010, at a Swiss program Infrarouge, on RTS Un. The same year, she was elected Miss Fêtes de Genève. She worked several months as an escort girl in the same town.

2012 : Secret Story 
Nadège participated in a French reality show of TF1, Secret Story season 6. On 1 June 2012 Nadège entered the House with Thomas Vergara. They share the secret: we are not really siblings. On 7 September 2012 she won the season 6 of Secret Story with 73% of votes - a record for a winner of the show - and 165,140 €.

2013-present : TV career and other projects 
During 2013, Nadège Lacroix officially got her first role, Lisa, in the series Sous le soleil de Saint-Tropez. In February she became a contender on a new reality TV show; Splash : le grand plongeon and was chosen by the public to go to the finals. She participated in the game show Fort Boyard on 10 August 2013. She also becomes a television presenter thanks to programs Télé-réalité : leur nouvelle vie, with Adrien Lemaître, and the French reality show Secret Story, with Benjamin Castaldi. The same year, she was a TV columnist in After Secret.

Early 2014, Nadège starred in the season 2 of Sous le soleil de Saint-Tropez. In December, Lacroix starred a recurrent role in the season 8 of Les Mystères de l'Amour.

Early 2015, she starred in the scripted television drama series, Hollywood Girls : Une nouvelle vie en Californie. During January - May 2015, she will starred in the play À vos souhaits, with Bernard Menez & Alexandra Kazan.

In 2016, she participated to three consecutive reality TV shows : the second season of Friends Trip, the eighth season of Les Anges and the third season of Les Ch'tis VS Les Marseillais (named Les Marseillais et les Ch'tis VS Le Reste du Monde).

In 2017, she co-hosts the French version of Ridiculousness, Ridiculous Made In France.

In 2022 she participates in the french TV show "les Cinquante" and was eliminated pretty fast.

Filmography

Awards and nominations

References

External links 
 

1986 births
Living people
Swiss television actresses
Participants in French reality television series
People from the canton of Geneva